Percy Jameson (21 July 1917 – 1981) was an English amateur footballer who played in the Football League for Darlington.

Jameson was born in Sunderland in 1917, the son of Percy Jameson, an electrical engineer, and his wife Alice née Daglish. He had two older siblings, Harold and Margaret. He signed for Sunderland from St Gabriel's as a "well-built young inside right" in the 1933 close season. He made no senior appearances for the club, and in 1936 signed amateur forms for Third Division North club Darlington, by which time he was playing either as a wing half or at inside forward. He made what proved to be his only senior appearance for the club, and only appearance in the Football League, playing at centre forward in a 1–0 win at home to Halifax Town on 1 April 1939. At the time of his wedding to Ada Scriven at Brunswick Methodist Chapel, Stockton-on-Tees, in 1943, Jameson was still a member of the Darlington club. His death at the age of 63 was registered in Sunderland in 1981.

References

1917 births
1981 deaths
Footballers from Sunderland
English footballers
Association football wing halves
Association football inside forwards
Sunderland A.F.C. players
Darlington F.C. players
English Football League players